The April 2019 Israeli legislative election was held using closed list proportional representation. Each party presented a list of candidates to the Central Elections Committee prior to the election.

Blue and White
The Blue and White list is headed by Benny Gantz and Yair Lapid.

Benny Gantz
Yair Lapid
Moshe Ya'alon
Gabi Ashkenazi
Avi Nissenkorn
Meir Cohen
Miki Haimovich
Ofer Shelah
Yoaz Hendel
Orna Barbivai
Michael Biton
Hili Tropper
Yael German
Zvi Hauser
Orit Farkash-Hacohen
Karin Elharar
Meirav Cohen
Yoel Razvozov
Asaf Zamir
Yizhar Shai
Elazar Stern
Mickey Levy
Omer Yankelevich
Pnina Tamano-Shata
Gadeer Mreeh
Ram Ben Barak
Alon Schuster
Yoav Segalovich
Ram Shefa
Boaz Toporovsky
Orly Fruman
Eitan Ginzburg
Gadi Yevarkan
Idan Roll
Yorai Lahav Hertzano
Moshe Matalon
Einav Kabla
Aliza Lavie
Itzhak Ilan
Tehila Friedman
Hila Vazan
Moshe Tur-Paz
Ruth Wasserman Lande

Alon Tal
Michal Wunsch
Anat Knafo

Deborah Biton
Idit Wexler
Vladimir Beliak
Keren Gonen
Yifat Ben Shoshan
Monica Lev Cohen
Ofra Finkelstein
Ya'akov Abu El Gian
Elyakim Nagid
Naor Shiri
Anat Shedami
Oz Haim
Mordechai Mizrahi
Inbar Bezek
Dan Reshel
Avery Steiner
Yaron Levi
Liad Herman
Nira Shpak
Yosef Tubor
Ronit Yuval
Moshiko Erez
Reuven Muzer
Shimon Sassi
Oren Or Biton
Sarit Handknopf
Daniel Avigdor
Liron Ben Tal
Ya'akov Levi
Noah Shmilov
Ohr Shalev
Tania Mazarsky
Ori Tzemach
Tomer Viur
Andrey Kozhinov
Hali Sinai
Gali Ofir
Yaron Mishori
Osnat Dror
David Shabbat
Yoav Ben Shalom
Shaked Benafshi
Michael Yisraelov
Ilana Bikabeltov
Yariv Friedman
Inbal Ben-Brit Cohen
Shlomit Friebar
Yigal Goroni
Nili Yohoshua
Amir Shoshani
Michael Gorin
Doron Pedahtzur
Golney Bochnik
Eran Dorovitch
Ilana Korotin
Uzi Yona
Ester Cohen
Sarah Pasternek
Boris Yampolski
Tzivia Berger Cohen
Zohar Bloom
Iris Segev
Dvorah Weinstein
Ilan Factor
Eliyahu Asulin
Orit Shani
Omri Nahum
Dalit Gur Cohen
Yasmin Fridman
Shoshana Inbar
Fier Bernas
Ronny Someck

Gesher
Gesher is a breakaway party led by Orly Levy-Abekasis.

Orly Levi-Abekasis

Yifat Bitton

Gilad Samama
Carmen Elmakiyes
Michal Nagari Hirsch

Haggai Lavie
Dan Shaham
Ronit Lev Ari
Malka Oliel
Yehudit Yifrah
Orly Kanubal
Noa Eliaz
Yehuda Katz
Eran Amir
Ziv Atiyah

Hadash–Ta'al
Hadash and Ta'al are running separately from the Joint List that they were part of at the last Knesset.

Ayman Odeh
Ahmad Tibi
Aida Touma-Suleiman
Osama Saadi
Ofer Cassif
Yousef Jabareen
Sondos Saleh
Jabar Asakla
Talal Alkernawi
Youssef Atauna
Wael Younis
Halad Hasuna
Noa Levi
Mohar Hosin
Padaa Naara
Hasan Hagla
Aatmad Kaadan
Shadi Abbas
Nabil Halaj
Gasan Abdullah
Darvish Rabi
Mohamed Kashkosh
Omer Wachad
Wasi Abu Ahmed
Safuat Abu Ria
Shadi Zidan 
Ziad Odah
Kassam Salam
Ibrahim El Sariyah
Monir Hamuda
Shochri Ouda
Shahira Morad
Mohamed Wated
Samah Araki
Noha Badar
May Gabar
Basal Darusha
Omri Barnas
Saad Paor
Oruah Sif
Mahar Achri
Hitam Wachad
Ali Saruji
Tzadok Tzadok
Vered Kubati
Kaid Alexasi
Busina Davit
Matua Haj-Yehiya
Omri Evron
Amami Halaila
Irin Hakira
Faris Abu Abaid
Meged Tibi
Ria Zahar
Sarur Mahammud
Said Issa
Raga Zaaraka
Oren Peled
Kassam Hoash
Lila Saliman
Nimrod Fleishenberg
Ahmed Haj Mohamed
Haviv Hagug
Rim Hazan
Ali Arash
Noraldin Hosin
Morid Mahmmud
Fathi Sabitah
Mohamed Haj Yehiah
Sami Yassin
Niroz Nafaa
Osama Karam
Tamar Kadiri
Dror Sadut
Ali Yassin
Bassam Abu Yassin
Zahi Salama
Abdalal Badoi
Aziri Basyoni
Magad Yusafin
Abduljabar
Yosef Lior
Naif Sachran
Mohamed Basul
Ala'a Naim
Nohad Sakes
Fatihya Sajir
Eitan Kalinsky
Hosam Shami
Yosef Amitai
Said Bechri
Laiti Sharif
Adana Zaritzky
Sharif Zoabi
Nissan Bracha
Ali Hidar
Abdalsalam Darusha

Amael Morkus
Manar Meiri
Mohamed Abari
Binyamin Gonan
Mussa Abu Sahibin
Tewfik Kanaana
Nagiba Jatas 
Assad Kanana
Abdalkarim Salabna
Hana Sweid
Abdullah Abu Ma'aruf
Ramiz Jaraisy
Salah Abu Shahin
Dov Khenin
Mansur Dahamasha
Aadel Amar
Issam Makhoul
Yosef Shahin
Tamar Gozansky
Afu Agbaria
Mohamed Nafa

Kulanu
The Kulanu list is headed by Moshe Kahlon.

Moshe Kahlon
Eli Cohen
Yifat Shasha-Biton
Roy Folkman
Tali Ploskov
Meirav Ben Ari
Akram Hasson
Asher Fentahun Seyoum
Nadav Sheinberger

Roei Cohen
Yehuda Mimran
Yael Yifrah
Rotem Kakon
Rotem Cohen Kahlon
Yuval Dudu
Yosef Wolf
Herzel Lavi
Yaki Ben Haim
Doron Yehuda
Yaarit Ashush
Lior Shapira
Tal Sigron
Oran Koriat
Miri Levi Bacha
Shlomo Dahan
Raz Kiel
Menashe Shemesh
Roi Elrom
Gavri Karadi
Aviad Zandenberg
Ran Mazor
Ziad Saadi

Labor Party
The Labor Party list is headed by Avi Gabbay.

Avi Gabbay
Tal Russo
Itzik Shmuli
Stav Shaffir
Shelly Yachimovich
Amir Peretz
Merav Michaeli
Omer Bar-Lev
Revital Swid
Haim Jelin

Ya-Ya Fink
Michal Biran

Eitan Cabel
Yael Cohen Paran
Saleh Saad
Emilie Moatti
Leah Fadida
Henrique Cymerman
Michal Tzernovitzki
Lili Ben Ami
Ahsan Halailah
Nachman Shai
Gilad Kariv
Moshe Mizrahi
Yisrael Ziv
Saadi Kablan

Tomer Pines
Ran Shusterman
Gil Beilin
Ilan Lederer
Amir Hanifas
Agmi Baron
Farachan Abu Riash
Solomon Abrahami
Nazar Aalimi
Eti Almog-Bar
Salman Tarodi
Nisim Lasri
Shalom Daskal
Nir Dombak
David Landsman
Itamar Wagner
Zahava Ilani
Yigal Shapira

Richard Peres
Anat Cohen Shpacht
Atara Litvak-Shacham
Silvio Hoskovitz
Debbie Ben Ami
Anat Marciano
Pini Kablo
Orly Biti Shiloah
Haya Cohen
Fahim Ganam
Shmuel Mizrahi
Yitzhak Shahaf
Mishel Halimi
Dalas Haviner Kroytoro
Sara Shunami
Nisim Peretz
Jackie Halimi
Dan Bilker
Hen Malcha
Roi Ben David
Alon Viser
Ofer Rimon
Or Ziv
Shaked Nuri
Itamar Gabaton

Timor Efroni
Tzvi Eisenberg
Yehonatan Regev
Ya'akov Mizrahi
Daniel Azulai
Tal Samahi
Noa Moalam
Gal Reich
Arnon Doikman
Yotam Dvir Dimora
Shai Masot
Asaf Kaplan
Rivka Ho Ravit
Hadassa Dayan
Gidon Meir
Aviad Sinai
Ilan Ben Saadon
Zohar Numerak
Mordechai Ajami

Yitzhak Meron
Dror Aloni
Ran Koenik
Yitzhak Holbasky
Adanah Solodar
Yisrael Gal

Simon Alfasi
Danny Atar
Yehiel Bar
Daniel Ben-Simon
Micha Goldman
Alex Goldfarb
Danny Yatom
Shimon Shetreet
Yael Dayan
Masha Lubelsky
Ron Huldai
Amram Mitzna
Ophir Pines-Paz
Ra'anan Cohen
Moshe Shahal
Uzi Baram
Aharon Yadlin
Shlomo Hillel

Likud
The Likud list is headed by current Prime Minister Benjamin Netanyahu.

Benjamin Netanyahu
Yuli-Yoel Edelstein
Yisrael Katz
Gilad Erdan
Gideon Sa'ar
Miri Regev
Yariv Levin
Yoav Galant
Nir Barkat
Gila Gamliel
Avi Dichter
Zeev Elkin
Haim Katz
Tzachi Hanegbi
Ofir Akunis
Yuval Steinitz
Tzipi Hotovely
Dudi Amsalem
Amir Ohana
Ofir Katz
Eti Atiya
Yoav Kish
David Bitan
Keren Barak
Shlomo Karhi
Miki Zohar
Eli Ben Dahan
Sharren Haskel
Michal Shir
Keti Shitrit
Fateen Mulla
May Golan
Uzi Dayan
Ariel Kellner
Osnat Mark
Amit Halevi
Nissim Vaturi
Shevah Stern
Ayoub Kara

Moti Yogev
Yehuda Glick
Nurit Koren
Ze'ev Flischman
Avital Dicter
Anat Berko
Rov Hirschman
Yaron Mazuz
Avraham Neguise
Nava Boker
Heidi Moses
Moshe Pesel
Elad Malka
Ya'akov Ben Sadon
Shalom Daninu
Zohar Tal
Assaf Yitzhaki
Ayala Steigman
Yosef Moalem
Tzachi Dicstein
Noam Selah
Dima Taiya
Elad Yona
Ata Parchat
David Avava
Tzofiya Nahon
Michael Lubobikov
Osama Navoani
Samir Kadiba
Ya'akov Vider
Salah Salah
Hassan Haib
Gumah Azbarga
Biyhad Mustafa
Faisel Hativ
Yoel Nagar
Lior Avavah Levatah
Mendi Safdi
Hinda Freidlman
Gilad Maharat
Jackie Pinto
Raffa Halabi
Gershon Eyalgieg
Tanogi Cohen
Shosh Halevi
Yosef Ben Pinhas
Shimon Hananel
Shimon Asael
Sinai Kehat
Dov Gilboa
Ze'ev Ben Yosef
Shlomo Madmon
Naomi Blumenthal
Yael Shamargad
Tova Maoz
Yohai Shitrit
Nissim Padida
Yaffa Lau
Hedva Speigel
Naor Naftali
Ziva Ben Dror
Eli Biton
Tziporah Feinberg
Eti Timor
Shabtai Kashat
Ariel Bochinek
Daliah Eigler
Bat Sheva Hahermoni
Elchanan Vinitski
Dudu Mor
Tzvi Eigler
Kokhava Matityahu
Haya Shamir
Akiva Nof
Michael Kleiner
Yosef Ahimeir
Miriam Glazer-Ta'asa
Zalman Shoval
Moshe Nissim

Meretz
The Meretz list is headed by Tamar Zandberg.

Tamar Zandberg
Ilan Gilon
Michal Rozin
Issawi Frej
Ali Salalha
Mehereta Baruch-Ron
Mossi Raz

Gaby Lasky

Cathy Piatzki Morag
Yaniv Shagia
Yariv Oppenheimer
Anat Nir
Nir Cohen

Mazen Abu Siam
Shai Agozi
Eliran Bichovsky
Susan Becher
Gilad Bar-On
Eyal Bergman
Giora Baram
Galia Golan Gold
Talilah Goren
Sagit Gurfinkel
Bar Gisin
Emily Greensweig
Danya Dobson
Tom Dromi Hakim
Ilai Harsagor-Henden
Veronica Vigdorchik

Walid Vated
Ofer Zabner
Rakefet Zohar
Etti Zidenberg
Omima Hamad
Oren Toktali
Shani Cohen
Ester Levanon Mordon
Ronny Lahav
Eyal Luria-Pardes
Shelly Milberg
Noa Noimark

Saadia Sadik-Masaruah

Salah Salalaha
Avi Ofer
Shosh Orer
Yoram Kendel
Maya Karbatri
Shuki Kromer
Yael-Hanna Kriger
Michael Regev
Simi Rokeah Ohayon
Shira Shagia Grucher
Omer Shechter
Ori Shmulevitz
Eidan Lamdan
Nir Elah
Dor Ben Dor
Adi Gisis Steinman
Abdul Haruv
Fuad Saliman
Roi Peled

Daniel Tzarfati
Tom Cohen
Gal Goldman
Sara Greensweig
Tzachi Zalicha
Yosef Alalo
Viviana Wolfson
Chagit Ofran
Natalie Kirstein
Ronit Winterov
Ilanit Harush
Visam Kashkosh
Zivah Sternhel
Nissim Chayun

Nissim Kalderon
Silvia Bizoy
Chelli Goldenberg

Moris Shachada
Susan Silberman
Itamar Swika
Suad Shahada
Naomi Tziyon
Tsvia Walden

Alex Levac
Dani Karavan
Ruth Rasnic
Nilli Oz
Ruth Dayan
Yishai Sarid
Yosef Marziano
Hayim Hayat

Mihal Shochat
Dror Morag
Shlomo Molla
Anat Maor
Colette Avital
Mordechai Bar-On
Amira Sartani
David Zucker
Avshalom Vilan
Hussniya Jabara
Naomi Chazan
Ran Cohen
Yair Tzaban
Yossi Beilin
Haim Oron

The New Right
The New Right is a new party formed as a breakaway from The Jewish Home. Its leaders are Naftali Bennett and Ayelet Shaked.

Naftali Bennett
Ayelet Shaked
Alona Barkat
Matan Kahana
Shuli Mualem
Caroline Glick

Uri Shekhter
Amichai Chikli
Shirly Pinto
Yomtob Kalfon
Ran Bar-Yoshafat
Roni Sassover
Moshe Peled
Yosef Ezra

Avivi Tzipkin
Shai Maimon
Dorian Cohen-Nov
Yael Yahav
Nir Herman
Ohad Ozan
Jeremy Saltan
Yosef Mandalevich

Shas
Shas is headed by Aryeh Deri.

Aryeh Deri
Yitzhak Cohen
Meshulam Nahari
Ya'akov Margi
Yoav Ben-Tzur
Michael Malchieli
Moshe Arbel
Yinon Azulai
Moshe Abutbul
Uriel Buso
Shlomo Dahan
Nahorai Lahiani
Yaakov Zacharyahu
Netanel Haik
Yosef Taieb
Yosef Tzedaka
Yonatan Mishraki
Lior Shaar
Tal Matityahu
Netanel Nahum
Elchanan Zevulun
Kafir Ovadyah
Yosef Kakon
Yosef Rosh
Yisrael Ben Sasson
Yosef Moalam
Boaz Biton
Yehuda Ovaidi
Moshe Kaicov
Refael Benraz
Yaakov Maalimi
Moshe Ailuz
Michael Tafiro
Chaim Rosh
Asher Shoker
Meir Cohen Ben Hayim

Hanan Zigdon
Hayim Asmaili
Avraham Betzalel
Avner Amar
Shmuel Marziano
Yehiel Tzruya
Manny Azulai
Dvir Luzon
Dan Cohen
David Cohen
Yigal Hadar
Yaacov Agasi
Saban Cohen
Avi Ben Avraham
Shlomo Ezran
Yair Elchadad
Yitzchak Hadad
Uzi Aharon
Moshe Vaknin
Shlomo Zalman Soyonov
Eliyahu Karai
Haggai Hadad
Eli Dadon
Ami Biton
Yosef Okanin
Tziyon Gazla
Yitzchak Elimelech
Shlomo Elcharar
Saadia Lopez
Yosef Turgeman
Meir Dahan
David Comus
Dan Tziyoni
Shimon Ben Shlomo
Hayim Ben Avraham
Yaacov Ben Shlomo
Yaacov Admoni
Efrayim Ohayon
Yehonatan Eliasi
Eli Ankonina
Meir Asulin
Avner Akava
Yaacov Biton
Yehiel Vaknin
Yitzchak Hudarah
Shai Hakshuri
Doron Taktuk
Hayim Tarab
Yishai Yizdai
Yehonatan Yalin
Yaacov Yuval
Yaacov Yifrah
Yehuda Yisraeli
Gavriel Cohen
Ofer Cohen
Rahamim Cohen
Moshe Levi
Meir Malka
Yitzchak Malchi
David Susiya
Ben Zion Siman Tov
Moshe Avitan
Hananel Harush
Yitzchak Avitabul
Yair Hamu
Netanel Cohen
Amit Pargon
Yosef Saltan
David Avitan
Moshe Cohen
Moshe Siboni
Yosef Niazoff
Shlomo Balhasan
Niv Ben Mocheh
Gidon Eliasi
Tzach Malul
Gadi Shalom
Shlomo Peretz
Aharon Cohen
Chaim Sabag
Gavriel Yisraelov
Hayim Baadani

United Arab List–Balad
After the break-up of the Joint List, Balad and United Arab List ran a combined list.

Mansour Abbas
Mtanes Shehadeh
Abd al-Hakim Hajj Yahya
Heba Yazbak
Talab Abu Arar
Mazen Ghnaim
Said al-Harumi
Mohamed Abgabariah
Iman Khatib-Yasin
Ata Abu Madiam
Walid Kadan
Sima Sindaoy
Nimar Hoson

Razi Issa
Tzafot Frige
Rauya Abu Raviah
Atya El Asam
Ahasan Haniah
Rasan Moniyar
Yehiya Daharmasa
Erin Havari
Mohamed Nassar
Nahala Tenus
Aida Fadila
Sami Jarban
Abed Masri
Iad Ravi
Aladin Zoabi Nassar
Lulu Taha
Mohamed Soa'ad
Ilaham Hamdan
Halad Afan
Sohilah Gatas
Mohamed Zavidat
Shalachat Antoan
Samar Samara
Avrahim Gatas
Rafat Ganim
Tagrid Gabarin-Jasar
Avrahim Rian
Nasri Said
Asmail El Gargaoi
Azaldin Badran
Mohamed Daas
Safa Agbariah
Yosef Padilah
Wail Omri
Mohamed Mahamid
Suliman Nasasara
Javadat Oydiah
Saliman El Atika
Fathi Amash
Saadia Shahav
Labad Abu Afash
Mustafa Abu Halal
Maruha Abad
Mohamed Satal
Amar Taha
Ranin Kais
Sohail Kayuan
Salah Hajj Yihia
Hosani Sultani
Mussa El Ovara
Mustafa Matani
Wassam Abud
Ibrahim Sachafi
Kosai Zamal
Abbas Amash
Jiris Sachas
Walid El Hoashlah
Albeir Andaria
Mohamed Masarua
George Shahada
Saad Jabar
Wasam Agbairiah
Sami Gabali
Mahmud Sa'ad
Mohamed Mitani
Nasser Zahara
Asmail Hasan
Ahmed Abu Amar
Omar A'asi
Isser Mezarib Abu Lil
Ahmed Shamruk
Bassam Shakur
Salah Kriim
Murad Hadad
Sami Ashawi
Michal Virshebski
Khaled Ghnaim
Silan Delal
Aiya Taha
Riad Mahamid
Atala al-Gamal
Adnan Matar
Nur Aldin Dabsan
Riad Ghattas
Mahmud Rian
Afnan Agbariah
Ibrahim Abu Laban
Leah Semal Virshebski
Ibrahim Shaliot
Hamza Hajj-Mohammed
Fathi Deka
Yussuf Shini
Mahasan Kis
Yussuf al-Karem
Juma Azbarga
Ibrahim al-Amur
Wasil Taha
Masud Ghnaim
Haneen Zoabi
Abdulmalik Dehamshe
Jamal Zahalka

Union of the Right-Wing Parties
A combined list called the Union of the Right-Wing Parties, composed of The Jewish Home, Tkuma, and Otzma Yehudit, is running.

Michael Ben-Ari, who was originally in position 5 on the list, was removed by the Supreme Court.

Rafi Peretz
Bezalel Smotrich
Moti Yogev
Ofir Sofer
Idit Silman
Orit Strook
Itamar Ben-Gvir
Yossi Cohen
Davidi Ben-Zion
Amichai Eliyahu
Yehoshua Zohar
Naama Zarbib
Miriam Abragil
Pinchas Meyuchas
Yonatan Dobov
Moshe Peretz
Eyal Asad
Orly Rappaport Yudkowski
Yifat Harari

Tzachi Maganzi
Yaacov Solar
Shimon Parchik
Ilana Dror
Tzvi Glintz
Oriya Reiter
Yael Ben-Yashar Ben-David
Yotam Karo
Chaim Marziano
Nitza Farkas
David Avicar
Shalom Stimler
Yael Saad
Yoel Toviana
Shmuel Meirovitz
Gavriel Klugman
Reuven Gur-Aryeh Habenstock
Yoela Rabinovitz
Yitzchak Wasserlauf
Bat-Sheva Shimoni
Yigal Hajaj
Avinoam Goalman
Meir Lozan
Moshe Cohen
Sagia Gaz
Eliyashiv Hacohen
Tzivya Lebovi
Nissan Slomiansky

United Torah Judaism
United Torah Judaism's list was headed by Deputy Minister of Health Yaakov Litzman.

Yaakov Litzman
Moshe Gafni
Meir Porush
Uri Maklev
Ya'akov Tessler
Ya'akov Asher
Yisrael Eichler
Yitzhak Pindros
Eliyahu Hasid
Eliyahu Baruchi
Binyamin Hirschler
David Ohana
Naftali Herz Glotzki

Reuven Breish
Aryeh Zvi Boymal
Yehiel Aryeh Weingarten
Avraham Rubinstein
Yosef Deutch
Ya'akov Gutman
Haim Meir Weisel
Yitzhak Ravitz
Yohoshua Weinberger
Menachem Mendel Shapira
Avraham Zvi Rossgold
Moshe David Morgenstern
David Greengold
Shlomo Goldental
David Asher
Eliezer Zvi Rochberger
Mordechai Brisk
Avraham Benzion Deutch
Avraham Breslar
Mordechai Michael Alfer
Shimon Kroizer
Shimon Yisrael Kelerman
Yehuda Gutman
Yisrael Golomb
Menahem Mendel Klein
Yisrael Moshe Friedman
Pinchas Tzeinwirt
Shlomo Zelig Orlinski
Yitzhak Klein
Pinchas Badosh
Gedaliah Sheinin
Yehuda Yevrov
Haim Baruch Weichelder

Yehoshua Cohen
Shabtai Markowitz
David Rotner
Shmuel Greenberg
Shmuel Tirer
Pinchas Siroker
Eliyahu Donat
Yitzhak David Brener
Akiva Ovitz
David Zaltz
Ephraim Wiesel
Michael Melamed
Meir Ringel
Ori Yaffa
Shimon Goldberg
Meir Yisrael Saberldov
Michael Garlitz
Avraham Pinchas Stern
Shmuel David Shock
Shimon Tuval
Shlomo Kostlitz
Shlomo Ephraim Pollak
Ahraon Tirhoz
Mordechai Goldberg
Yehezkel Bakenrot
Yosef Shitrit
Yisrael Haim Cohen
Eliyahu Yosef Broner
Yisrael Miller
Yitzhak Epstein
Pinchas Barim
Shlomo Hominer
Eliyahu Shachter
Aryeh Yehuda Pollak
Yekutiel Neiman
Binyamin Lewinstein
Shlomo Deutch
Shlomo Montag
David Rubinstein
Ofer Ezra
Moshe Lavron
Nissan Lavi
Ya'akov Yosef Ganz
Aryeh Zisman
Yehuda Aryeh Rosen
Elhanan Fromer
Ya'akov Haim Zorger
David Miller
Aryeh Weitz
Efphrayim Weiss
Moshe Yosef Overlander
Natan Weiss
Asher Hanun
Shlomo Stern
Haim Shmuel Bakerman
Yona Moskowitz
Binyamin Ze'ev Haker
Moshe Frank
Yoel Froilich
Elhanan Ehrentreu
Eliyahu Gafni
Moshe Man
Yehezkel Landau
Avraham Yitzhak Mishovski
Yehuda Roth
Ya'akov Vijbinski
Yohoshua Mendel
Shimon Chadar
Avraham Shwartz

Hanoch Zeibert
Eliezer Sorotskin

Yisrael Beiteinu
The Yisrael Beiteinu list is headed by Avigdor Lieberman.

Avigdor Lieberman
Oded Forer
Evgeny Sova
Eli Avidar
Yulia Malinovsky
Hamad Amar
Alex Kushnir
Mark Ifraimov
Limor Magen Telem
Elina Bardach-Yalov
Shadi Halul
Alexander Friedman
Dor Doydian
Shachar Alon
Ilana Kratysh
Moshe Sadia
Boris Schindler
Hila Yadid Barzilai
Aviv Cohen
Amir Shneider

Zehut
Zehut is a libertarian party headed by Moshe Feiglin.

Moshe Feiglin
Haim Amsalem
Gilad Alper

Libby Molad
Shai Malka
Refael Minnes
Albert Levy
Ron Tzafrir
Ben Tzion Spitz
Yiskah Binah
Shmuel Sackett
Shlomo Gordon
Arcadi Mutter
David Spitz

Nitza Kahane

Tzvi Ben Tzion Sand
David Sidman
Hagai Greentzeig
Tovah Even Chen
Hagai Ben Ami
Nadav Halamish
Alex Elman
Meir Kadosh
Michael Puah
Moshe Marom
Uri Noi
Adam Ruso
Rafi Farber
Aryeh Zonenberg
Michael Brichzer
Lior Yado
Yaacov Lavern
Adiel Sharabi
Shlomo Wolfish
Guy Lilian
David Ovadiah
Yirmiyahu Taub
Michael Savasah
Tomer Gordman
Dorothy Marom
Eliyahu Ben Asher
Moshe Aroch
Sagit Ben Tzvi
Gershon Kagan
Illi Nolar
Moshe Schwartzberger
Eldad Shimon
Elida Jacobson
Ofer Shimoni
Yarden Weber
Aryeh Bayit
David Rashid
Yosef Mantiband
Neriya Saada
Binyamin Elbaum
Moshe Basus
Boaz Beringer
Omer Gal
Elitzur Segal
Hemdat Shani
Li-On Fingler
Yotam Halprin
Hayim Friedman
David Ben Tzvi
Lior Hashmia
Itamar Holder
Mali Schmidt
Talia Cohen
Yosef Cohen
Daniel Gabbai
Aliza Waltzki Cohen
Alida Mendelson
Aharon Chalamish
Uriel Harpaz
Bar Yifrach
Ziva Katz
Gitit Botra
Amit Mizrachi
Yair Liberman
Lisa Liel
Eliyahu Sleizerman
Tomer Rashkovitsky
Kani Mark
Reuven Moriel
Elchanan Rafaeli
Ariyeh Kalkalar
Shachar Kalaminian
Hadar Rotenberg
Yigal Shefer
Ronen Hazan
Marius Popel
Aviner Hoshen
Roni Kashi
Iti Givon
Shelly Karzan
Guy Enosh
Ori Pokez
Moshe Wolf
Raziel Hess Green
Yonadav Stern
Eli Botra
Leah Karp
Uri Zilberman
Dana Shem Tov
Dror Kotner
Elad Azbodki
Alexander Loit
Yaron Modan

Minor parties
The following are the lists for the minor parties running in the election that have not been featured in major opinion polling in the lead-up to the election.

Ahrayut LaMeyasdim
Ahrayut LaMeyasdim (Responsibility for Founders) is a party headed by former Knesset member, Haim Dayan.

Haim Dayan
Reuven Korman
Haim Ben Shalom
Ganadi Boroshovski
Yom Tov Bibey
Aminadav Argov
Yael Galzar
Hadas Karmitzer
Eli Cohen
Shmuel Zissman
Adam Anav
Ya'akov Levi
Hanina Dahan
Moshe Franko
Yitzhak Ben Yitzhak
Meir Tantz
Yitzhak Dishi
Eli Sahar
Peretz Sulam
Raisa Shtibler
Shmaya Lev Ran
Shalom Afalelo
Giora Mendler

Ani VeAta
Ani VeAta (Me and You) is a party focused on social issues and a stand against the "growing extremism in the right".

Alon Giladi
Zahava Ozabi
Rafael Ohayon
Amnon Vilner
Margalit Dod Hatzor
Yevgenia Ivashov
Yehuda Sharabi
Yael Gril
Meirav Gruber
Adit Hagbi
Yona Peleg
Geoffrey Mantzer
Haviva Tzidon
Limor Even Hen
Freida Nehama
Reuven Meshumar Adani
Yafa Pozilov
Ron Klapp
Ze'ev Cohen
Moshe Perlmutter
Feiga Gutman
Elroi Paz
Shulamit Stern

Arab List
The Arab List is a party that aims to achieve Palestinian statehood and equality for Arab citizens of Israel.

Muhamad Kanan
Afif Ibrahim
Halad Dirini
Mohamed Masri
Iyov Abu Siyud
Karam Mahamid
Osama Adoi
Vajaia Ibrahim
Manael Azam
Basam Zoabi
Mohadi Omar
Majda Miari
Hasal Abu Ras
Visam Asmail
Fiyad Hibi
Hasan Gaoi

Betah – Social Security

Eti Swartzberg
Moshe Moskowitz
Menahem Haim
Kashney Swartz
Oleg Lewinski
Chanis Lovov
Eli Zohar
David Agib
Avraham Partosh
Roman Leiderman
Daniel Harel

Brit Olam
Brit Olam is a social justice party committed to the separation of religion and state and the creation of a Palestinian state.
Ofer Lipshitz

Daam Workers Party
Daam is a communist party that aims to bring about the end of capitalism as a means to achieve social change.

Tamir Gal
Zoabi Menadra
Mihal Swartz Ben Efrat
Samia Nassar
Erez Wagner
Vaffa Tiarah
Daniel Ben Simchon
Yael Frenkel
Guy Elon
Tzipporah Freidman
Orit Sudri
Ornah Akad
Tomer Lahav
Tali Klagsborn
Adiv Lahav
Roni Ben Efrat
Arik Taylor
Assaf Adiv
Asma Aghbaria Zahalka
Ya'akov Ben Efrat

Education

Adir Zaltzar
Sigal Avishai
Eitan Finkelstein
Bracah Strausfield
Nir Naftali
Maya Simon
Salam Kidsi
Shlomo Blair
Ezer Graidi
Orly Holey
Haim Pashi
Serah Sabat
Iris Barnea
Daliah Zahngi
Nitzchona Segev
Victor Ohana
Ruti Turgeman
Elah Aharon

HaTikva LeShinui
HaTikva LeShinui (Hope for Change) is an Arab Israeli party that aims for equality between the Arab and Jewish citizens of Israel.

Rami Mohamed
Tarad Abu Elasal
Hani Elhoashla
Mazan Kak
Samach Chaladi
Binan Taha
Abdullah Abdelrahman
Mohamed Abu Ghosh

Ihud Bnei HaBrit
Ihud Bnei HaBrit is headed by Bishara Shalian.

Bishara Shalian
Eyal Paltek
Yosef Sisu
Rami Abu Regev
Tzvi Gal Ed
A'adel Shahada
Amir Shalian

Justice for All
Justice for all is a party for all living creatures that fights for the rights of all life on the planet.

Ya'akov Casdi
Alon Doidov
Amma Aharonov
Rahel Ozen
Shai Erez
Sharma Lavi

Kavod HaAdam

Arkadi Pogetz
Gavriel Amirov
Alexander Alperin
Rahamim Niassov
Irlianna Trodjampor
Rochelle Babib
Peter Kolishnichko
Ya'akov Dadshev
Yinon Menahimov
Alexei Babib

Ketz

Denis Lipkin
Hannah Havah
Michael Bar-Netzer
David Friedman
Klaus Beker

LeMa'an Ezrahim Sug Bet
LeMa'an Ezrahim Sug Bet (For Second Class Citizens) believes that the country is being run by the rich for the rich, and stands for protecting average citizens.

Rafael Levingrond
David Michaeli
Michael Litvak
Hila Oz-Sharon
Akiva Lev
Uri Zar
Natalie Sachaik
Benzion Gagolah

Kol Yisrael Ahim and Peula LeYisrael
Kol Yisrael Ahim (All Israel Are Brothers) is a party dedicated to the Ethiopian community in Israel. They have formed a union with Peula LeYisrael (Action for Israel).

Alali Adamso
David Navi
Michael Corinaldi
Jambar Kabdah
Yosi Shisel
Zahava Aragi
Eli Raz
Avner Parachi
Aharon Sason
Amara Malko
Yuval Shokar
Sharon Halperin Barzilai
Advah Baza
Adir Maroi
Ariel Adari
Barhano Taronen

Magen
Magen (Protector) is led by retired general Gal Hirsch, and is focused on social issues.

Gal Hirsch
Yitzhak Elnar
Asher Tishler
Reim Pelach
Anna Farber
Shimon Camri
Ya'akov Farber
Shira Georgie
Romy Zondar-Kislev
Moshe Zoldan
Samar Hanno
Ester Farder
Aryeh Amit
Adi Ben Dror
Adi Lesker
Tamar Eliyahu
Herzl Loiper
Chai Pessach
Smadar Peretz
Shiran Selah Dan-Gur
Tamar Hovel
Eliya Simchov
Meor Morviah
Ruti Adri
Or Hayekari

Manhigut Hevratit
Manhigut Hevratit (Social Leadership) is a party that is focused on personal economic struggles in Israel and want a broad electoral coalition in the Knesset.

Ilan Meshicha Yar-Zanbar
Shaked Kahalon
Talia Rotenberg
Ehud Berkowitz
Eliyasaf Pesach

Mehathala
Mehathala (From the Start) is a party that is focused on economic issues. 

David Erez
Anan Pelah
Norit Menachem
Gad Robovsky
Elad Stapensky
Anastasia Gloshkov
Yaniv Moyel
Netanel Balmes
Eiman Abu Tavama

Na Nach
Na Nach is a party of Breslov Hassidim.

Ilan Bronson
Nehama Darab Berkowitz
Hananiah Sharabi Shoker
Shmuel Siyag
Nes Shoshai
Yosef Toito
Meor Malin
Moshe Ofir
Baruch Fishman
Sharon Yosef
Yonatan Kliger
Nissim Yehezkel
Noam Nativ
Naor Shimoni
Moshe Shani
Yehezkel Yehezkel
Mordechai Barzilai
Feiga Kanapo
Ester Shani
Avraham Vershabski
Naftali Hertz Farkas
Avraham Cohen
Yehuda Friedman
Zamir Avraham
Yehonatan Perry
Moshe Yannai
Tomer Avraham
Nitzan Koppel
Yisrael Ben Yehiel
Eliya Tzairi
Matan Aviram
Eldad Madi 
Shanir Yisraelit
Zohar Gorgi
Adi Ran

New Zionist Party
The New Zionist Party is a libertarian party.

Binyamin Unger
Peracha Sefadi
Moshe Bar
Miriam Masri
Solomon Malul
Dan Kadron
Shai Shokron
Rachel Torknovitz

Ofek Hadash BeKavod

Salman Abu Ahmed
Mohamed al-Said
Mesam Majdob
Shoaki Shanon
Manar Hailla
Hiadra Mari
Ahmed Manaa
Majid Falah
Rawah Taha
Wasab Aasla
Yassar Moasi
Mohamed Salab

Older Citizen's Party
The Older Citizen's Party is a party dedicated to pensioner's rights.

Amit Saar Shalom
Ya'akov Ashrey
Yosef Galtzar
Yosef Kozdo
Avraham Sheinfein
Yitzhak Ziv
Linor Atias
Ofra Ohr
Yitzhak Banishti
Rivka Cohen
Feivel Rosenberg
Natan Strauss
Yerahmiel Cooperman
Henrik Roter
Yitzhak Shabtai
Ziv Eldror

Pashut Ahava

Lilian Weisberger
Anhar Masarwa
Rivia Basis
Yael Tridal
Anthony Heiman
Olifat Cheidar
Batina Zalof
Rima Basis
Yosef Jamal

Pirate Party
The Pirate Party is connected to the global network of Pirate Parties that fight for Internet freedoms.

Noam Kuzar
Ohad Shem Tov
Dan Biron
Kit Goldstein
Amit Didovski
Meital Rom
Itai Ankar
David Rom
Lior Mizrachi
Matan Goldberg
Ori Amikam

Pitaron LeAza
Shmuel Levi

Reform Party

Abed Alsala Kashua
Ismael Jamal
Yosef Shelby
Zahar Haskia
Iad Matani
Omir Cabha
Tamim Araki
Darjam Gabara
Azhar Nasar
Ednaan Araki
Hamdan Zamiro

Shavim

Mirit Entebe
Tali Gottlieb
Eyal Shmuelevitz
Mordechai Fishler
Yaniv Peretz
Shadi Janam

Social Justice
Social Justice is a party dedicated to equality and democracy that is ideologically close to Binyamin Netanyahu.

Gad Haran
Nazim Saviti
Betali Yisraeli
Mordechai Ashkenazi
Yulia Ben Moshe
Benny Lotan
Efrayim Kahane
David Romano
Ilan Ronan
Nahum Gantzreski

Tzomet
Tzomet is a secular right wing party that was in the Knesset from 1984-1988.

Oren Hazan
Moshe Green
Ayelet Shlisel
Aviram Belzar
Sarah Erez
Nadir Sheiner
Guy Raif
Alexander Sholtz
Orit Hayun
Shental Hozner
Guy Salmon
Yishai Bosani
Moshe Gross
Sharona Tzur

Yashar Party
Yashar Party is a direct democracy party.

Yuval Karniel
Merav Teshuva-Shanhav
Malak Badar
Oded Gilotz
Aryeh Zidan
Dror Dassa
Almog Pilpeli
Dorit Eliyahu
Ira Katz-Galai
Rivka Hazan
Zeev Weisner Loven
Natan Menoam
Mihal Katosvski
Matan Pinkus
Sivan Holtzman
Arnon Boch

Zekhuyotenu BeKoleinu
Zekhuyotenu BeKoleinu (Our Rights In Our Vote) is a party that has a strong focus on strengthening the security services.

Gil Roter
David Siton
Shimon Cohen
Amir Berabi
Basam Kazal
Yafa Shahori
Shlomo Meyuhas
Shoshi Noval
Pelah Aleli
Yaniv Boaz

References

2019 1